Brady Malam (born 14 March 1973) is a New Zealand former rugby league footballer.

Early years
He played for the Junior Kiwis in 1992 and 1993. In the 1994 Lion Red Cup Malam played one match for the Waitakere City Raiders.

Auckland Warriors
In 1996 he made his Australian Rugby League début for the Auckland Warriors and was a key part of the reserve grade team that made the grand final. He was also named Development Player of the Year. He went on to play 55 games for the Warriors, both from the bench and starting at prop. In 1997, during the Super League war, he made his début for New Zealand in the triseries against Queensland and New South Wales.

Wigan Warriors
In 2000 he moved to England to play for the Wigan Warriors in the Super League. He made 25 appearances and played for the Wigan Warriors from the interchange bench in their 2000 Super League Grand Final loss against St Helens R.F.C. He was released by the club at the end of the year.

References

New Zealand rugby league players
New Zealand Warriors players
Glenora Bears players
Living people
Auckland rugby league team players
Waitakere rugby league team players
Wigan Warriors players
1973 births
Rugby league hookers
Rugby league props
Place of birth missing (living people)
Junior Kiwis players